Plasmepsin II (aspartic hemoglobinase II, PFAPD) is an enzyme. This enzyme catalyses the following chemical reaction

 Hydrolysis of the bonds linking certain hydrophobic residues in hemoglobin or globin. Also cleaves the small molecule substrates such as Ala-Leu-Glu-Arg-Thr-Phe-Phe(NO2)-Ser-Phe-Pro-Thr

This enzyme is present in malaria organism, Plasmodium.

References

External links 
 

EC 3.4.23